Antennablennius adenensis, the Aden blenny, is a species of combtooth blenny found in the western Indian Ocean, from the Red Sea to the Persian Gulf and Pakistan.

References

adenensis
Fish described in 1951
Taxa named by Alec Fraser-Brunner